Øvre Ramse is a village in Åmli municipality in Agder county, Norway. The village is located along the river Tovdalsåna in the Tovdal valley.

References

Villages in Agder
Åmli